Chernysh is a gender-neutral Ukrainian surname. It may refer to the following notable people: 

Denys Chernysh (born 1999), Ukrainian footballer
Dmytro Chernysh (born 1998), Ukrainian footballer
Hryhoriy Chernysh (born 1942), Ukrainian politician
Vadym Chernysh (born 1971), Ukrainian jurist and politician

See also
 

Ukrainian-language surnames